Ludovic Lepic and His Daughters is a painting by Edgar Degas that was completed around 1871. The painting depicts Ludovic-Napoléon Lepic with his young daughters. Degas also depicted Ludovic Lepic in the painting Place de la Concorde.

On February 10, 2008, the painting was stolen from Foundation E.G. Bührle in Zürich, Switzerland. It was recovered in April 2012 with slight damage.

See also
1871 in art
2008 in art
2012 in art
List of stolen paintings
Les Choristes, another Degas work stolen and then recovered

References

External links
Foundation E.G. Bührle: Ludovic Lepic and His Daughters

1870 paintings
Paintings by Edgar Degas
19th-century portraits
Paintings of children
Stolen works of art
Recovered works of art